Cycloptilum irregularis is a species of cricket endemic to the United States.

References

Insects of the United States
Crickets
Taxonomy articles created by Polbot
Insects described in 1979